Selenium yeast is a feed additive for livestock, used to increase the selenium content in their fodder. It is a form of selenium currently approved for human consumption in the EU and Britain. Inorganic forms of selenium are used in feeds (namely sodium selenate and sodium selenite, which appear to work in roughly the same manner). Since these products can be patented, producers can demand premium prices. It is produced by fermenting Saccharomyces cerevisiae (baker's yeast) in a selenium-rich media.

There is considerable variability in products described as Se-yeast and the selenium compounds found within. Many manufacturers and products on the market are simply mixtures of largely inorganic selenium and some yeast. Selenium is found in different forms based upon the food in which it is found. For instance, the form found in mustard and garlic is different from the form found in wheat or corn. In some products, the added selenium is structurally substituted for sulfur in the amino acid methionine, thus forming an organic chemical called selenomethionine via the same pathways and enzymes. Owing to its similarity to sulfur-containing methionine, selenomethionine is mistaken for an amino acid by the yeast anabolism and incorporated in its proteins. It has been claimed that selenomethionine makes a better source of dietary selenium in animal nutrition, since it is an organic chemical compound sometimes found in some common crops such as wheat.

Animal feed additive

Large amounts of selenium are toxic; however, it is physiologically necessary for animals in extremely small amounts. Many other uncharacterized selenium-containing organic chemicals are also produced by a method similar to that of selenomethionine; some have recently been characterized but remain relatively unknown, such as S-seleno-methyl-glutathione and glutathione-S-selenoglutathione. Due to this, the European Union has questioned the safety and potential toxicity of this food supplement for humans, and it may not be used as an additive after 2002. 

G.N Schrauzer, who has written two papers about selenomethionine, claims it should be an essential amino acid, and that the product is completely safe. The European Food Safety Authority does allow the use of selenomethionine as a feed additive for animals. Because organic forms of selenium appear to be excreted from the body slower than inorganic forms, products enriched with organic selenium might detrimentally bioaccumulate in the body. Because selenium-enriched foods contain much more selenium than natural foods, selenium toxicity is a potential problem, and such foods must be treated with caution. The EU allows up to 300 micrograms of selenium per day, but one long-term study of selenium supplementation showed no evidence of toxicity at a dose as high as 800 micrograms per day.

An organic selenium-containing chemical found in selenium yeast has been shown to differ in bioavailability and metabolism compared with common inorganic forms of dietary selenium. Dietary supplementation using selenium yeast is ineffective in the production of antioxidants in bovine milk compared to inorganic selenium (sodium selenate). One study examined if increased selenium in the diet of mutant mice (via a selenium yeast product) caused a higher production of selenium-containing enzymes which have an antioxidant effect. The effect was modest.

Selenium supplementation in yeast form has been shown to increase pig selenium-containing antioxidant enzymes, broiler growth and meat quality, the shelf life of turkey and rooster semen, and possibly cattle fertility.

Selenium supplementation in animal feeds may be profitable for agribusinesses. It may be possible to market selenium-fortified foods to consumers as functional foods, such as selenium-enriched eggs, meat, or milk.

Sel-Plex®

A patented cultivar of yeast (Saccharomyces cerevisiae 'CNCM I-3060') marketed as Sel-Plex® has been approved for use in animal fodder:
	U.S. Food and Drug Administration approval for use as a supplement to feed for chickens, turkeys, swine, goats, sheep, horses, dogs, bison, and beef and dairy cows.
	Organic Materials Review Institute approval for use as a feed supplement for all animal species.
	As of 2006, the European Food Safety Authority's Scientific Panel on Additives and Products or Substances used in Animal Feed allows the use of Sel-Plex® in animal fodder for poultry, swine, and bovines, as the selenium is not significantly bio-accumulated by the human consumer. Only a small amount should be used when blending animal feeds, 10x the authorized maximum selenium intake causes a drop in production. Appropriate measures to minimize inhalation exposure to the product should be taken.

Analytical chemistry

Total selenium in selenium yeast can be reliably determined using open acid digestion to extract selenium from the yeast matrix followed by flame atomic absorption spectrometry. Determination of the selenium species selenomethionine can be achieved via proteolytic digestion of selenium yeast followed by high-performance liquid chromatography with inductively coupled plasma mass spectrometry.

See also

Nutritional muscular dystrophy

References

Selenium
Biology and pharmacology of chemical elements
Yeasts
Food additives
Organoselenium compounds